Waldheimat is an Austrian television series.

See also
List of Austrian television series

External links 
 

Austrian television series
ORF (broadcaster)
1980s Austrian television series
1983 Austrian television series debuts
1984 Austrian television series endings
German-language television shows
Television shows based on novels
Television series set in the 1850s
Television series set in the 1860s